Nomlaki (Noamlakee), or Wintun, is a moribund Wintuan language of Northern California. It was not extensively documented, however, some recordings exist of speaker Andrew Freeman and Sylvester Simmons.

There is at least one partial speaker left per Golla (2011).

See also
 Paskenta Band of Nomlaki Indians

References

External links
Overview at the Survey of California and Other Indian Languages
Nomlaki language at the California Language Archive
OLAC resources in Wintu and Nomlaki

Wintuan languages
Endangered indigenous languages of the Americas
Indigenous languages of California
Native American language revitalization